Zafuleptine (INN) (proposed brand name Thymeon) is an antidepressant developed in the mid-1970s which, despite apparently having a chosen brand name, was never marketed.

References

Amines
Antidepressants
Carboxylic acids
Fluoroarenes